Kizkapanli, Pazarcik is a settlement in the Pazarcık district of Kahramanmaraş province. The population is 699 according to a 2000 census.

Archaeology 
The Pazarcık Stele was found here. It is an Assyrian monument comprising a boundary stone that was erected by the Assyrian king Adad-nirari III in 805 BC to demarcate the border between the kingdoms of Kummuh and Gurgum.

Geography 
There are the villages of Kelleş in the south, Kuzkent in the southwest, Salmanlı in the west, Ufacıklı in the east and Memişkahya in the north.

Geographically, the village is built on a stony and rough terrain.

Notes 

Kahramanmaraş Province
Villages in Kahramanmaraş Province
History of Kahramanmaraş Province